Perelman is a worn impact crater that lies on the Moon's far side. It is located less than one crater diameter to the northwest of the prominent crater Scaliger. To the west-southwest is the elongated Bowditch. Southwest of Perelman is a small lunar mare that has been named Lacus Solitudinis.

This crater is generally unremarkable. It is worn and eroded with an uneven outer rim. The satellite crater Perelman E is attached to the eastern exterior. The crater is free of significant overlapping impacts. There is a low ridge near the midpoint of the interior floor.

Satellite craters
By convention these features are identified on lunar maps by placing the letter on the side of the crater midpoint that is closest to Perelman.

References

 
 
 
 
 
 
 
 
 
 
 
 

Impact craters on the Moon